Czapek may refer to:

People
 Elisabeth Czapek (1860–1949), Swedish miniature painter
 Franciszek Czapek (1811–1895), Polish watchmaker, founder of Czapek & Cie
 Friedrich Czapek (1868–1921), Czech botanist who developed Czapek medium
 Leopold Eustachius Czapek (1792–1840), Czech-Austrian pianist and composer

Other uses
 Czapek & Cie, a watch company
 Czapek medium, a medium for growing fungi in a lab

See also
 
 Čapek, a surname